Arian Mršulja (born 11 February 1998) is a Croatian football player, who currently plays for Vršac.

Club career
He made his debut in the Russian Football National League for FC Neftekhimik Nizhnekamsk on 19 September 2021 in a game against FC KAMAZ Naberezhnye Chelny.

References

External links
 
 Profile by Russian Football National League

1998 births
Footballers from Rijeka
Living people
Association football defenders
Croatian footballers
A.S.D. Mezzolara players
Birkirkara F.C. players
Senglea Athletic F.C. players
FK Smederevo players
HNK Šibenik players
FC Neftekhimik Nizhnekamsk players
Serie D players
Maltese Premier League players
Serbian First League players
Croatian Football League players
Russian First League players
Croatian expatriate footballers
Expatriate footballers in Italy
Croatian expatriate sportspeople in Italy
Expatriate footballers in Malta
Croatian expatriate sportspeople in Malta
Expatriate footballers in Serbia
Croatian expatriate sportspeople in Serbia
Expatriate footballers in Latvia
Croatian expatriate sportspeople in Latvia
Expatriate footballers in Russia
Croatian expatriate sportspeople in Russia